The Three Rural Issues, or San Nong, are three issues relating to rural development in mainland China: agriculture, rural areas and farmers. The name "Three Rural Issues" was first coined by economist Wen Tiejun in 1996, and were highlighted by CCP general secretary Hu Jintao and Chinese premier Wen Jiabao as areas of rural development in China that need work.

At the 2006 National People's Congress, the Three Rural Issues were especially emphasized throughout Wen Jiabao's speech on the workings of the government in 2005 and the direction of the government for the year 2006. In the rural areas, agricultural reforms had made the peasants better-off until the 1990s when land supply became insufficient and the cost of the means of production was soaring. As a result, the income of the peasants was greatly reduced. Today, the "three problem of peasantry, rural areas and agriculture" are still a major concern of the government.

Content
Agricultural issues：The main problem is agricultural production and operation, specifically how to achieve agricultural industrialization. This is mainly due to the low degree of marketability of agricultural production and operation and the high volatility of agricultural prices; the fact that agricultural production mainly relies on small-scale farmers, making it difficult to obtain economies of scale; and the fact that the issue of food security has never been neglected.
Rural issues：It is concentrated in the urban-rural dichotomy caused by the household registration system, with a large difference in economic and cultural levels between urban and rural areas. The image is likened to China's City like Europe，The countryside is like Africa.
Farmers' issues：The main problems are the low income of farmers, the large gap between urban and rural incomes, the low overall cultural quality of farmers and the lack of protection of farmers' Rights, etc.
"The countryside is the cradle of the Chinese nation, agriculture is the foundation of the national economy, and farmers are our bread and butter. If we lose these three, we will also lose the foundation of our nation".

Agriculture
In general, the issue is how to industrialize agriculture in China.

It includes:
 increasing the marketization level of agricultural production and operation, and stabilizing the prices of agricultural products
 changing the situation of smallholder economic agriculture, achieving economies of scale of agricultural production and operation
 guaranteeing the food security in China.

Rural areas
This is particularly reflected in the disparity of economic and cultural development between urban and rural areas. It is mainly caused by the dual segmentation based on the household registration system.

Farmers
It includes improving the income level of farmers, alleviating burdens of farmers, increasing the cultural qualities of farmers, and safeguarding the rights of farmers.

See also
2006 National People's Congress
Economy of China
Agriculture in China

External links 
Expectations and challenges for China's economy next year, article dated December 6, 2004, at People's Daily Online.
President Hu Addresses "Three Rural Issues" at CRIENGLISH.com.
China to tackle rural problems at BBC NEWS.
 三农直通车（中国科技部十二五规划项目）
 中国农村村民自治信息网（民政部基层政权和社区建设司主办）
 關注最大的國事：三農問題
 三農問題の基本的認識

Economic development in China
Rural development in China